The Alliance for the Protection of Nature and Society (TTVSZ), was a political party in Hungary between 1990 and 1995.

History
The TTVSZ was founded in January 1990 by biochemist and Természet Világa editor-in-chief Tibor Gánti, who also led the party as President of the Coordination Board. The party contested in the 1990 parliamentary election with two individual candidates, who received 0.03 percent of the votes, gaining no seats. The TTVSZ did not participate solely in the 1994 parliamentary election, its leader Gánti ran as a candidate on the national list of the National Democratic Alliance, but did not obtain a mandate.

Election results

National Assembly

References

Sources

Defunct political parties in Hungary
Green political parties in Hungary
Political parties established in 1990
Political parties disestablished in 1995
1990 establishments in Hungary
1995 disestablishments in Hungary